Gelora Sriwijaya Stadium, also known as Jakabaring Stadium (literally "Sriwijaya Sports Arena Stadium"), is a multi-purpose stadium located in Jakabaring Sport City complex in Palembang, South Sumatra, Indonesia. It is currently used mostly for football matches.  The stadium holds 23,000 spectators. The construction began in 2001 and finished in 2004 to host the 2004 Indonesia National Games. The stadium was initially named as Jakabaring stadium after the location of the stadium in southern outskirt of Palembang. However, later the stadium was renamed "Gelora Sriwijaya", to honor and celebrate the 7th—13th century Indonesian empire of Srivijaya. The Third Place Playoff of the 2007 AFC Asian Cup was held in this stadium. The football club Sriwijaya is based at the stadium.

History 
The stadium, which began construction on January 1, 2001, was intended to host the XVI PON when the city of Palembang was appointed as the organizer on September 2, 2004. The stadium was named after the maritime empire of Sriwijaya, which was based in Palembang and succeeded in unifying the western region of the archipelago in the 7th century until 12th century. In addition, this stadium is also the headquarters of the Indonesian football club, Sriwijaya FC. This stadium was used as one of the stadiums that hosted matches in the 2007 Asian Cup as a companion to the Gelora Bung Karno Main Stadium on the third match day and also the struggle for third place. AFC verification results make this stadium one of the 3 AFC standard stadiums in Indonesia. 

This stadium became the main stadium at the opening and closing ceremonies of the 2011 SEA Games and 2013 Islamic Solidarity Games in Palembang.

Design 

The capacity of this stadium is 23,000 spectators, with four tribune (A, B, C, and D) around the main field. The size of main soccer field is 68 x 105 metres, surrounded by eight lanes athletics track and field with red gravel surface. The main tribune on west and east side (A and B) is covered with two large steel arch. Two bulbous blue roofs supported by these arches took form of the sail of the ship, symbolizes Srivijaya as the maritime empire. On the main outer wall on west and east side adorned with songket textile motifs as the cultural identity of Palembang. The main score screen is located on southern tribune (tribune D), while the fire cauldron is located in southern side of the main field between the soccer field and athletic tracks. This stadium also contains three standard squash field.

The stadium underwent renovations prior to the 2018 Asian Games, converting it to an all-seater stadium. Shortly prior to the Games, 335 of the new seats were damaged by fans in the aftermath of a Sriwijaya F.C. loss.

Stadium damage 

Sriwjaya F.C. lost 0-3 to Arema FC, 335 seats were damaged due to the actions of supporters during the 2018 Liga 1 match. It is suspected that the anarchist perpetrators were in the North Stand by the Singa Mania group and the South Stand by the Sriwijaya Mania group. The Palembang Police have indicated that they will not give permission to Sriwijaya FC to hold a match in the near future, considering that the 2018 Asian Games are in sight. The South Sumatra Provincial Government and the Indonesian Army personnel have begun repairing the damage to the two spectator stands.

Entertainment events
18 August 2019 - Westlife - The Twenty Tour

Sporting events

International
 2005 AFF U-20 Youth Championship
 2007 AFC Asian Cup for Group D match between Saudi Arabia vs Bahrain and Third Place match between South Korea vs Japan
 2010 AFF Suzuki Cup for Group A match between Malaysia vs Laos
 2011 Southeast Asian Games main venue.
 2013 Islamic Solidarity Games for opening and closing along for football matches.
 2014 ASEAN University Games main venue.
 2018 AFF U-16 Girls' Championship
 2018 AFF Women's Championship
 2018 Asian Games women's football
 2022 AFF U-18 Women's Championship
 2023 FIFA U-20 World Cup

National
 2004 Indonesia National Games for opening and closing along for football matches (2004).
 2008-09 Copa Indonesia for Third Place and Final match between Persipura Jayapura vs Sriwijaya.
 2010 Indonesian Inter Island Cup for Group B and Final match between Persiwa vs Sriwijaya.
 2014 Indonesian Inter Island Cup Final match between Arema Cronous vs Persib.
 2014 Indonesia Super League Semifinals and Final match between Persipura Jayapura  vs Persib.

International matches hosted

Recent tournament results

2005 AFF U-20 Youth Championship

2007 AFC Asian Cup

2010 AFF Championship

Football at the 2013 Islamic Solidarity Games

2018 AFF Women's Championship

Football at the 2018 Asian Games – Women's tournament

2022 AFF U-18 Women's Championship

Concerts and shows

Gallery

See also
 List of stadiums in Indonesia
 List of stadiums by capacity

References

Multi-purpose stadiums in Indonesia
Sports venues in Indonesia
Football venues in Indonesia
Athletics (track and field) venues in Indonesia
Sports venues in South Sumatra
Football venues in South Sumatra
Athletics (track and field) venues in South Sumatra
Multi-purpose stadiums in South Sumatra
Sports venues in Palembang
Football venues in Palembang
Athletics (track and field) venues in Palembang
AFC Asian Cup stadiums
Post-independence architecture of Indonesia
Sports venues completed in 2004
Venues of the 2018 Asian Games
Asian Games football venues
Southeast Asian Games stadiums